Nicholas Metson Ullett (born 5 March 1941) is a British-born American actor. For a number of years, he was part of a comedy duo with Tony Hendra.

Filmography
 Call of Duty: Finest Hour (2004) (VG) (voice) (as Nick Ullet)
 Yes, Dear (1 episode, 2003)
 When Billie Beat Bobby (2001) (TV movie)
 The Practice (2 episodes, 2000)
 Home Improvement (1 episode, 1999)
 As the World Turns (1956) TV series .... Graham Hawkins (unknown episodes, 1992–1994)
 Hook (1991)
 The Golden Girls (1 episode, 1991)
 Blossom (2 episodes, 1991)
 Night Court (2 episodes, 1990–1991)
 Murphy Brown (1 episode, 1991)
 Down and Out in Beverly Hills (1986)
 Three's a Crowd (1 episode, 1985)
 Down on Us (a.k.a. Beyond the Doors (video title)) (1984)

Personal life
Ullett has been married to American film, stage and television actress Jenny O'Hara since 20 July 1986; they had three children. She is his fourth wife. He was previously married to Catherine Blum (1967–1970; divorced); Marcia Greene (1970–1976; divorced, with whom Ullett also had one child), and Joan Agda Wood Schneider (1980– divorced).

References

1941 births
Living people
American male soap opera actors
American male stage actors
American male television actors
British male soap opera actors
British male stage actors
Place of birth missing (living people)
British emigrants to the United States
Male actors from London
20th-century American male actors
21st-century American male actors